Cyclotropis may refer to:
 Cyclotropis (gastropod), a genus of gastropods in the family Assimineidae
 Cyclotropis, a genus of millipedes in the family Aphelidesmidae, synonym of Thrinoxethus
 Cyclotropis, a genus of gastropods in the family Oriostomatidae, synonym of Beraunia